Notable events of 2013 in webcomics.

Events

Randall Munroe creates the Hugo Award-winning 3,099 panel xkcd strip "Time".
The Modern Tales family of websites closes in April.
Joey Manley, founder of webcomic syndicates such as Modern Tales and Webcomics Nation, dies at age 48.

Awards
Eisner Awards "Best digital comic" won by Paul Tobin and Colleen Coover's Bandette.
Harvey Awards, "Best Online Comics Work" won by Mike Norton's Battlepug.
Ignatz Awards, "Outstanding Online Comic" won by Jillian Tamaki's SuperMutant Magic Academy.
Joe Shuster Awards, "Outstanding Webcomics Creator" won by Michael DeForge (Ant Comic).
Reuben Awards, "On-Line Comics"; Short Form won by Graham Harrop's Ten Cats, Long Form won by Vince Dorse's Untold Tales of Bigfoot.
Cartoonist Studio Prize, "Best Web Comic" won by ND Stevenson's Nimona.
Aurora Awards, "Best Graphic Novel" won by Alina Pete's Weregeek.
Mythopoeic Fantasy Award for Adult Literature won by Ursula Vernon's Digger.

Webcomics started

 January 26 — A Simple Thinking About Blood Type by Real Crazy Man
 January 28 — Table Titans by Scott Kurtz
 March – The Private Eye by Brian K. Vaughan and Marcos Martín
 April – Kill Six Billion Demons by "Abbadon" (Tom Parkinson-Morgan)
 May – Up and Out by Julia Kaye
 May 8 — Tales of the Unusual by Oh Seong-dae
 May 18 – DICE by Yoon Hyeon-seok
 June – Henchgirl by Kristen Gudsnuk
 June 30 — Qahera by Deena Mohamed
 July – Fowl Language by Brian Gordon
 August 8 — Check, Please! by Ngozi Ukazu
 August — ēlDLIVE by Akira Amano
 September 4 – Love Revolution by 232
 September 5 — The Gamer by Sung Sang-Young and Sang-Ah
 October 8 – The Last Halloween by Abby Howard
 October 12 — ReLIFE by Sō Yayoi
 October 31 – Blindsprings by Kadi Fedoruk
 November 1 — Stand Still, Stay Silent by Minna Sundberg
 November 3 — New Normal: Class 8 by Youngpaka
 November 21 – Let's Speak English by Mary Cagle
 November — Trans Girl Next Door by Kylie Summer Wu
 December 11 — Million Doll by Ai
 December — The Out-of-Placers by Valsalia
 Sarah's Scribbles by Sarah Andersen
 Year Hare Affair by Lin Chao

Webcomics ended
 FreakAngels by Warren Ellis and Paul Duffield, 2008 – 2013 
 Fashion King by Kian84, 2011 – 2013
 Orange Marmalade by Seok Woo, 2011 – 2013
 A Redtail's Dream by Minna Sundberg, 2011 – 2013
Misaeng by Yoon Tae-ho, 2012 – 2013
About Death by Sini and Hyuno, 2012 – 2013

References

 
Webcomics by year